Jack Payne may refer to:

 Jack Payne (Australian rules footballer) (born 1999), Australian footballer for Brisbane Lions
 Jack Payne (bandleader) (1899–1969), British dance music bandleader 
 Jack Payne (footballer, born 1991), English footballer for Crawley Town
 Jack Payne (footballer, born 1994), English footballer for Charlton Athletic
 Jack Payne (rugby union) (born 1994), Australian-Welsh rugby union player

See also 
 John Payne (disambiguation)